Yerkebulan Shynaliyev (born October 7, 1987) is an amateur boxer from Kazakhstan best known to win the bronze medal at light heavyweight at the 2007 World Amateur Boxing Championships.

Career
Shynaliyev won silver at the World Junior Championships in 2006.

At the seniors 2007 the short southpaw beat Asian Champ Jahon Qurbonov and Tony Jeffries 20:9 but lost to eventual winner Abbos Atoev 8:17 in the semifinal.

Olympic games results 
2008 (as a Light heavyweight)
Defeated Daugirdas Semiotas (Lithuania) 11-3
Defeated Carlos Negrón (Puerto Rico) 9-3
Defeated Djakhon Kurbanov (Tajikistan) WDQ 3 (2:43)
Lost to Zhang Xiaoping (China) 4-4

Note: Shynaliyev was leading 12-6 when Kurbanov was disqualified for biting Shynaliyev on the shoulder.

World amateur championship results 
2007 (as a Light heavyweight)
Defeated Evgeni Chernovol (Moldava) 28-10
Defeated Djakhon Kurbanov (Tajikistan) DQ 4
Defeated Zhang Xiaoping (China) 14-5
Defeated Tony Jeffries (England) 20-9
Lost to Abbos Atoev (Uzbekistan) 8-17

References

External links
Juniors 2006
World 2007
sports-reference

Living people
Dughlats
1987 births
Boxers at the 2008 Summer Olympics
Olympic boxers of Kazakhstan
Olympic bronze medalists for Kazakhstan
Olympic medalists in boxing
Medalists at the 2008 Summer Olympics
Kazakhstani male boxers
AIBA World Boxing Championships medalists
Light-heavyweight boxers
21st-century Kazakhstani people